Laís Yasmin Lucas Gontijo (Cuiabá, 16 December 1990) is a Brazilian singer and songwriter.

Biography 

Yasmin Lucas began her career at age 5 by recording music for a Brazilian soap opera, in 2004 Yasmin traveled to Greece to record the theme song of Greek Paralympic Games in Brazil.

In 2008, Yasmin Lucas represented Brazil in the New Orleans Jazz & Heritage Festival in New Orleans singing the song "Fever" and impress many critics of music, recorded music that was the subject of the movie Pokémon 3: The Movie, became known in Europe due to the overwhelming success of the song "Acontece Esquece", and made her name in the international market singing with Alex Band, former lead singer of The Calling.

Discography 

Studio albums
 1997: Yasmin 
 2000: Declaração  
 2002: O Mundo dos Sonhos de Yasmin  
 2013: Lais

Singles

References

External links 
  Portuguese
 https://www.twitter.com/yasminlucas
 https://www.myspace.com/yasmingontijo
 Yasmin Lucas

1990 births
Living people
Brazilian singer-songwriters
Brazilian child singers
People from Cuiabá
21st-century Brazilian singers
21st-century Brazilian women singers
Brazilian women singer-songwriters